The word 'algebra' is used for various branches and structures of mathematics. For their overview, see Algebra.

The bare word "algebra" 
The bare word "algebra" may refer to:
 Elementary algebra
 Abstract algebra
 Algebra over a field

In universal algebra, algebra has an axiomatic definition, roughly as an instance of any of a number of algebraic structures, such as groups, rings, etc.

Branches of mathematics 
 Elementary algebra, i.e. "high-school algebra"
 Abstract algebra
 Linear algebra
 Relational algebra
 Universal algebra

The term is also traditionally used for the field of:
 Computer algebra, dealing with software systems for symbolic mathematical computation, which often offer capabilities beyond what is normally understood to be "algebra"

Mathematical structures

Vector space with multiplication 
An "algebra", or to be verbose, an algebra over a field, is a vector space equipped with a bilinear vector product. Some notable algebras in this sense are:
 In ring theory and linear algebra:
 Algebra over a commutative ring, a module equipped with a bilinear product. Generalization of algebras over a field
 Associative algebra, a module equipped with an associative bilinear vector product
 Superalgebra, a -graded algebra
 Lie algebras, Poisson algebras, and Jordan algebras, important examples of (potentially) nonassociative algebras
 In functional analysis:
 Banach algebra, an associative algebra A over the real or complex numbers which at the same time is also a Banach space
 Operator algebra, continuous linear operators on a topological vector space with multiplication given by the composition
 *-algebra, An algebra with a notion of adjoints
 C*-algebra, a Banach algebra equipped with a unary involution operation
 Von Neumann algebra (or W*-algebra)
See also coalgebra, the dual notion.

Other structures 
A different class of "algebras" consists of objects which generalize logical connectives, sets, and lattices.
 In logic:
 Relational algebra, in which a set of finitary relations that is closed under certain operators
 Boolean algebra and Boolean algebra (structure)
 Heyting algebra
 In measure theory:
 Algebra over a set, a collection of sets closed under finite unions and complementation
 Sigma algebra, a collection of sets closed under countable unions and complementation

"Algebra" can also describe more general structures:
 In category theory and computer science:
 F-algebra and F-coalgebra
 T-algebra

Other uses 
 Algebra Blessett, singer from the U.S, goes by the stage name Algebra

See also 
 Algebraic (disambiguation)
 List of all articles whose title begins with "algebra"